The 1886 Grand National was the 48th renewal of the Grand National horse race that took place at Aintree Racecourse near Liverpool, England, on 26 March 1886.

Finishing Order

Non-finishers

References

 1886
Grand National
Grand National
19th century in Lancashire
March 1886 sports events